William McKenzie Barlow (November 2, 1870 – February 14, 1963) was a Canadian amateur ice hockey player in the late 19th century. He played for the Montreal Hockey Club, champions of the Amateur Hockey Association of Canada (AHAC) from 1888 to 1897, and first winners of the Stanley Cup in 1893. Barlow is credited with scoring the first Stanley Cup-winning goal in history in the final playoff match of 1894.

Personal
Barlow was born in Montreal. He received his education at the Belmont School. As well as ice hockey, Barlow played lacrosse for the Montreal AAA. He married Winnifred Amelia Sully. They had one son, Gerald, and one daughter. Barlow became a director of Lymans Limited pharmaceuticals during the 1930s, and secretary of the Welfare Foundation until his retirement in 1949. He died on February 14, 1963, at his home in Notre-Dame-de-Grâce. He is interred in Mount Royal Cemetery.

Hockey career
As a member of the first Stanley Cup-winning squad in 1893, the Montreal Amateur Athletic Association gave Barlow a ring to commemorate the win. Barlow's ring is now on display in the Hockey Hall of Fame, after having been donated by Barlow's daughter. As well as playing, Barlow also refereed games of the AHAC.

Career statistics

Source: Coleman (1966)

See also
 List of Stanley Cup champions

References and notes

External links
 description of first Stanley Cup final on Backcheck

1870 births
1963 deaths
Anglophone Quebec people
Canadian lacrosse players
Montreal Hockey Club players
Ice hockey people from Montreal
Stanley Cup champions
Burials at Mount Royal Cemetery